Aayaase (also known as ᐋᔾᔮᐦᔥ (Aayaash; unpointed as ᐊᔾᔭᔥ) or Iyash; recorded by William Jones as Āyāsä) is a character found in the Aadizookaan of the Anishinaabe peoples.  Similar in nature to the Ojibwa Nanabozho stories, the Aayaash stories tell of his trials and tribulations, with each story carrying a moral.

References

External links
The Legend of Iyash at KNet's Legend site.
The Story of Iyash (Archived 2009-10-24)

Anishinaabe mythology
Mythological characters